Emanuel Couto (born 6 August 1973), is a former professional tennis player from Portugal. He achieved a career-high doubles ranking of World No. 91 in 1997.

The highest moment of his career was his only ATP level victory in his home country at the Oporto Open in 1996 with fellow Portuguese player and regular doubles partner Bernardo Mota.

Couto participated in 20 Davis Cup ties for Portugal from 1994 to 2003, posting a 13–5 record in doubles and an 11–10 record in singles.

Couto also represented Portugal in the Olympics in Barcelona 92 and Atlanta 96 in the doubles category.

Career finals

Doubles: 2 (1 title, 1 runner-up)

Awards
2013 – ITF Commitment Award

References

External links
 
 
 

1973 births
Living people
Portuguese male tennis players
Olympic tennis players of Portugal
Tennis players at the 1992 Summer Olympics
Tennis players at the 1996 Summer Olympics
People from Guarda, Portugal
Sportspeople from Guarda District